Tricesimo is a comune (municipality) in the Province of Udine in the Italian region Friuli-Venezia Giulia, located about  northwest of Trieste and about  north of Udine.

The municipality of Tricesimo contains the frazioni (subdivisions, mainly villages and hamlets) Ara Grande, Ara Piccola, Felettano, Fraelacco, Leonacco, Braidamatta, Colgallo, and Adorgnano.

Tricesimo borders the following municipalities: Cassacco, Pagnacco, Reana del Rojale, Tarcento, Tavagnacco, Treppo Grande, Fagagna.

Demographic evolution

Twin towns
Tricesimo is twinned with:

  Mittersill, Austria

References

External links
 www.comune.tricesimo.ud.it

Cities and towns in Friuli-Venezia Giulia